Catocala frederici is a moth of the family Erebidae. It is found in Texas, Oklahoma, New Mexico and Arizona.

The wingspan is 40–52 mm. Adults are on wing from June to September depending on the location. There is probably one generation per year.

References

External links
Species info

Moths described in 1872
frederici
Moths of North America